Group A of the 2009 Fed Cup Europe/Africa Zone Group III was one of two pools in Group III of the Europe/Africa zone of the 2009 Fed Cup. Five teams competed in a round robin competition, with the top team advanced to Group II for 2010.

Finland vs. Malta

Ireland vs. Algeria

Greece vs. Ireland

Algeria vs. Malta

Greece vs. Algeria

Finland vs. Ireland

Greece vs. Malta

Finland vs. Algeria

Greece vs. Finland

Ireland vs. Malta

  placed first in this group and thus advanced to Group II for 2010. They placed first in their pool of four and also won their promotion play-off match, meaning they achieved promotion to Group I for 2011.

See also
Fed Cup structure

References

External links
 Fed Cup website

2009 Fed Cup Europe/Africa Zone